9F or 9-F may refer to:

Locomotives
 BR Standard Class 9F, a class of 2-10-0 steam locomotives
 BR Standard Class 9F 92020-9
 BR Standard Class 9F 92220 Evening Star
 List of preserved BR Standard Class 9F locomotives
 GCR Class 9F, a class of 0-6-2T steam locomotives

Other uses
 2020 Salvadoran political crisis, commonly referred to as 9F (9th February)
 New York Route 9F, now New York State Route 9G
Fluorine (9F), a chemical element

See also
 F9 (disambiguation)
 February 9
 9ff, a German car tuning company
 Grumman F9F Panther, an American carrier-based fighter aircraft
 Grumman F9F Cougar, an American carrier-based fighter aircraft